Lisowo may refer to the following places:
Lisowo, Podlaskie Voivodeship (north-east Poland)
Lisowo, Gryfice County in West Pomeranian Voivodeship (north-west Poland)
Lisowo, Koszalin County in West Pomeranian Voivodeship (north-west Poland)
Lisowo, Stargard County in West Pomeranian Voivodeship (north-west Poland)